Ehrlichiosis ewingii infection is an infectious disease caused by an intracellular bacteria, Ehrlichia ewingii. The infection is transmitted to humans by the tick, Amblyomma americanum. This tick can also transmit Ehrlichia chaffeensis, the bacteria that causes human monocytic ehrlichiosis (HME).

Symptoms and signs
Patients can present with fever, headache, myalgias, and malaise. Laboratory tests may reveal thrombocytopenia, leukopenia, and evidence of liver damage.

Mechanism
Humans contract the disease after a bite by an infected tick of the species Amblyomma americanum.
Those with an underlying immunodeficiency (such as HIV) appear to be at greater risk of contracting the disease. Compared to HME, ewingii ehrlichiosis has a decreased incidence of complications.

Like Anaplasma phagocytophilum, the causative agent of human granulocytic ehrlichiosis, Ehrlichia ewingii infects neutrophils. Infection with E. ewingii may delay neutrophil apoptosis.

Diagnosis
In endemic areas, a high index of suspicion is warranted, especially with a known exposure to ticks. The diagnosis can be confirmed by using PCR. A peripheral blood smear can also be examined for intracytoplasmic inclusions called morulae.

Treatment
The treatment of choice is doxycycline.

See also
 Human monocytic ehrlichiosis
 Human granulocytic ehrlichiosis
 Ehrlichiosis (canine)

References

External links 

Bacterium-related cutaneous conditions
Tick-borne diseases